Zebra cake can refer to one of the following:
 Icebox cake
 A marble cake in a zebra-striped pattern
 A pre-packaged cake with zebra-striped frosting manufactured by the Little Debbie brand of McKee Foods